Henricus pampasianus is a species of moth of the family Tortricidae. It is found in Cotopaxi Province, Ecuador.

The wingspan is about 22 mm. The ground colour of the forewings is cream, suffused with brownish, preserved in the tornal fourth of the wing. The subterminal interfascia are browner and the remaining area is suffused brown black. The refractive suffusions are weak and bluish. The hindwings are whitish, tinged with brown on the periphery.

Etymology
The species name refers to the type locality of San Francisco de las Pampas.

References

Moths described in 2008
Henricus (moth)